Persephone,  the daughter of Zeus and Demeter in Greek mythology, appears in films, works of literature, and in popular culture, both as a goddess character and through the symbolic use of her name. She becomes the queen of the underworld through her abduction by Hades, the god of the underworld. The myth of her abduction represents her dual function as the as chthonic (underworld) and vegetation goddess: a personification of vegetation, which shoots forth in Spring and withdraws into the earth after harvest. Proserpina is the Roman equivalent.

In film and television
Walt Disney's 1934 Silly Symphony short The Goddess of Spring adapts the story of Persephone's (voiced by Jessica Dragonette) abduction by Hades (voiced by Tudor Williams), and how she returns to the earth for half a year. She is not called by her name.
A character named Persephone appears in The Matrix Reloaded and The Matrix Revolutions, played by Monica Bellucci. She is the wife of the Merovingian, a powerful program that handles other programs exiled from the Matrix. In the Matrix Revolutions, they are seen together as being seated in a rave club named Club Hel, possibly a strong reference to Hel, the underworld of Norse Mythology, and Hell, the underworld in Christian Theology.
In the BBC Television series Spooks the title of Series 3 Episode 6 is "Persephone", referring to character Zoe Reynold's code name during an undercover operation.  The storyline parallels that of Greek mythology.
Persephone (played by Andrea Croton) appears in two episodes of Hercules: The Legendary Journeys.
Persephone is portrayed by Elisabetta Genovese in Pasolini's The Canterbury Tales. In the film, Pluto gives the elderly, blind cuckold Sir January his sight back to see his wife cheating. In response, Persephone implants good excuses in the wife May's mind so that she can go unpunished. See also The Merchant's Tale.
 In the television series Once Upon a Time, Zelena, the Wicked Witch, takes the place of Persephone.
 In the 2018 movie The Fare, a cabdriver picks up a passenger named Penny on a desolate road. The cabdriver turns out to be Charon the ferryman and Penny is really Persephone and he ferries her back to the Underworld every year.

In literature
 Mary Shelley wrote a "mythological drama" titled "Proserpine," which was published posthumously.
 Algernon Charles Swinburne published "Hymn to Proserpine" and "The Garden of Proserpine" in 1866.
 Second April, a collection of poetry by Edna St. Vincent Millay published in 1921, contains two poems which make explicit reference to Persephone: "Ode to Silence" and "Prayer to Persephone."
 In Eva Ibbotson's young adult novel A Company of Swans the heroine Harriet Morton eats pomegranate seeds in the hope that will mean she has to remain in Brazil rather than go back to her family home in Cambridge.
 Persephone is a main character in the webcomic Lore Olympus.
 In The Last Olympian, the last book of Percy Jackson & the Olympians by Rick Riordan, Persephone convinces her husband Hades to spare the life of the demigod Percy Jackson.  She later re-appears with her mother and husband to fight Kronos.

In popular culture

The Stephen King book Duma Key features the evil supernatural character "Perse" as the antagonist to the main character.  As the novel reaches its conclusion, it transpires that "Perse" is actually short for Persephone.
A Court of Mist and Fury, the sequel to A Court of Thorns and Roses fantasy series by Sarah J. Maas, is loosely based on the myth of Hades and Persephone.
The comic Epicurus the Sage by William Messner-Loebs and Sam Kieth features a fractured version of the abduction of Persephone, adding in the comic twist that Hades and Persephone had staged the entire kidnapping simply to get away from her overbearing mother.
Persephone appears as a character in the books The Demigod Files, as well as The Last Olympian of the Percy Jackson series, the latter in which she has gained love for Hades over the years.
The 2014 comic book series The Wicked + The Divine features Persephone as one of the gods who reincarnate every 90 years by taking over someone else's body.  This modern interpretation of Persephone has powers that include summoning vines from the ground.
 In John C. Wright's Orphans of Chaos, "the Maiden", a title of Persephone's, is a candidate for the throne of Olympus after Zeus's death.
 In the manga Colette wa Shinu Koto ni Shita by Yukimura Alto, a loose retelling of the story is created, with the main character being a human doctor.

In video games 

In the video game Ogre Battle 64, the Goddess Danika, was seduced by Demunza, the king of the netherworld by eating a cursed fruit, which turned her into the queen of the netherworld. However, when she is summoned by someone pure of heart, she will revert to her goddess form.
In the video game BioShock 2, Persephone is the name given to the prison facility that spans over two levels, Inner Persephone and Outer Persephone.
Persephone is the final boss and the main antagonist of the 2008 video game God of War: Chains of Olympus. Her remains in a tree casket are seen and used in the 2010 video game God of War III and Hades mentions her death at Kratos' hands as part of the reason he has a vendetta against him.
Persephone is depicted as goddess of life in Sacrifice
In Elite: Dangerous, Persephone is the name given to the game's fictional depiction of the hypothetical Planet Nine in the Sol system, a world made largely of ice but with no atmosphere.
In Skylanders, Persephone gives Skylanders upgrades in exchange for gold and is the most powerful fairy.
In Assassin's Creed: Odyssey, Persephone is depicted in the first episode of The Fate of Atlantis DLC, titled Fields of Elysium. She is depicted as ruling over Elysium. Like her depiction in Greek mythology, she is mentioned as being married to Hades and is therefore the Queen of the Underworld as well as ruling Elysium. She is also mentioned as being the goddess of spring and nature. She is essentially the antagonist of the episode.
In Hades, Persephone is depicted living in Greece, having left the Underworld. She is the mother of the game's protagonist Zagreus, and is the motivation to his repeated escapes from the Underworld. Unlike actual Greek mythology, her father is not Zeus and instead a mortal man, Persephone is her chosen name, and her mother Demeter originally named her Kore.
Persephone is a playable goddess in SMITE.

In music 

"Persephone (the gathering of flowers)" is the final track of the Dead Can Dance album Within the Realm of a Dying Sun. The song's musical narrative traces a path of death and rebirth.
Cocteau Twins released "Persephone" in 1984 on their critically acclaimed album Treasure.
The progressive death metal band Persefone is named after the Greek goddess, and they have released an album called "Core", which is based on the myth of Persephone.
Song 3 on the 1974 album There's the Rub by Wishbone Ash is titled Persephone.
The album Strangefolk by artist Kula Shaker featured a track titled and about Persephone.
The album Turbo Ocho by Roger Clyne and the Peacemakers features a track titled Persephone as a love song written by Hades to Persephone.
The folk opera Hadestown based on the myth of Orpheus, Persephone is a main character.
Ani DiFranco portrays Pershephone in the 2010 concept album, while in the stage adaptation the role was originated by Amber Gray.
The musical Mythic is a modern-day pop rendition of the myth  

"Persephone" is the instrumental opening track of Opeth's 2016 album Sorceress. The album's theme (including several of its tracks) arguably contains elements loosely related to the Persephone myth. The closing track is also entitled "Persephone (slight return)".
Persephone is mentioned in Tori Amos' song Pandora's Aquarium, from 1998's From the Choirgirl Hotel.

"Persephone" is mentioned in a single from singer-songwriter Tamino's debut album.

"Pomegranate Seeds" by Julian Moon, 2017, tells the tale of the Persephone Myth from a first person perspective.
"Persephassa", a piece for six percussionists composed by Iannis Xenakis in 1969
Allison Russell's first solo album, Outside Child, features a single titled “Persephone.”

Planets beyond Neptune 

When a 10th 'planet' was discovered in July 2005, a poll in New Scientist magazine picked Persephone as the public's favourite name. Its status as a planet was later downgraded to dwarf planet together with Pluto and was given the name Eris. Before that, the name was often used in science fiction to refer to hypothetical planets beyond Neptune and Pluto (such as Planet X and even Planet Nine, theorized in 2016).

References

Persephone
Classical mythology in popular culture
Greek underworld in popular culture
Greek and Roman deities in fiction
Mythology in popular culture